Czerwony album (The Red Album) is a debut album by Polish hip-hop rapper and producer Abradab, released on June 8, 2004 by S.P. Records. The album featured artists such as Gutek, Tede, WSZ and CNE. The album peaked at #14 on the Polish OLiS chart. In 2004 Czerwony album earned the Fryderyk award for Album of the Year – rap/hip-hop.

Track listing

References 

2004 debut albums
Polish-language albums
Abradab albums